The Demopolis Public School also known as Demopolis Junior High School is a historic public school building in the city of Demopolis, Alabama.  It was designed by architect Frank Lockwood in the Beaux-Arts style and was completed in 1914.  The new two-story brick building replaced an earlier two-story Queen Anne style wood-frame structure that was built in 1889 and burned in 1913. The contractors for the new building were J.T. Clancy and W.M. Neely.  The building continued as a part of the Demopolis City School System until it closed its doors in June 1981.  The school was added to the National Register of Historic Places on October 28, 1983.  The building now houses a theater group, the Canebrake Players.

The site was previously occupied by Marengo Military Academy building, which was destroyed by fire in 1913.

References

National Register of Historic Places in Marengo County, Alabama
School buildings on the National Register of Historic Places in Alabama
Beaux-Arts architecture in Alabama
School buildings completed in 1914
Defunct schools in Alabama
Educational institutions disestablished in 1981
1914 establishments in Alabama